The 15483 / 15484 Sikkim Mahananda Express or Mahananda Express is an Indian Express train connecting the cities of Old Delhi and Alipurduar.
The train connects the Eastern and Northern regions, as well as parts of India in the Bihar & Uttar Pradesh areas.

The name of the train is derived from the Mahananda River, which runs through North Bengal and Eastern Bihar.

As the entire route is not electrified, the train runs with both an electric and diesel locomotive. Usually the train gets a WDP-4/WDP-4B from the Siliguri Diesel Loco Shed for the non-electrified territory and a WAP-4 electric locomotive in the electrified section.

History
This train was later extended to New Jalpaiguri with train number(s) 4083/4084. Finally the train was extended to Alipurduar Junction.

Route & Halts

Pt. Deen Dayal Upadhyaya Junction

 
   (Loco Reversal)

 Binnaguri Junction
 Dalgaon Railway Station
 Hasimara Railway Station to
 '''

Locomotive
It is hauled by a Diesel Loco Shed, Siliguri-based WDP-4 / WDP-4B / WDP-4D locomotive from APDJ till KIR and then  from KIR till DLI it is hauled by a Ghaziabad-based WAP-7 or  Pandit Deen Dayal Upadhyay Jn -based WAP-4 locomotive and vice versa.

Trivia
In a rare occurrence Sikkim Mahananda Express crosses the Mahananda River five times. The train is named after this river.

Train schedule
Train No.15484 leaves Delhi (DLI) at 06:35 AM and reach to the destined stop Alipurduar Junction (APDJ) at 06:45 PM on day after another.
Train No.15483 leaves Alipurduar Junction (APDJ) at 09:50 AM and reach to the destined stop Delhi (DLI) at 10:40 PM on day after another.
During the journey of approximately 38 hours the train goes via 56 stations before reaching its destination.

Accommodations
This train comprises 1 Composite AC [2-Tiers+3-Tiers], 2 AC 3-Tiers, 13 Sleeper class, 5 Unreserved General Compartment, 1 Pantry car & 2 Luggage/Parcel cum Brake van which is provided with the Guards' cabin.
Total coach composition is 24.

Incidents

See also
 New Jalpaiguri–New Delhi Superfast Express

References

External links
  Indian Railway Website
 Mahananda Express Forum at Indian Rail Info
 Indian Railway Fan Club
List of All Indian Trains

Transport in Alipurduar
Transport in Delhi
Named passenger trains of India
Rail transport in West Bengal
Rail transport in Uttar Pradesh
Rail transport in Bihar
Rail transport in Delhi
Express trains in India
Alipurduar railway division